María Teresa Portela Rivas (born 5 May 1982) is a Spanish sprint canoer who has competed since the early 2000s. Portela competed in six Summer Olympics, earning a silver medal on her sixth games at the 2020 Summer Olympics in Women's K-1 200 m. Previously she finished fourth on one occasion (2012 Summer Olympics: Women's K-1 200 m) and fifth on three occasions (2004: K-2 500 m, K-4 500 m; 2008: K-4 500 m). 

She won 15 medals at the ICF Canoe Sprint World Championships with 2 golds (K-1 200 m: 2002, 2005), 6 silvers (K-1 200 m: 2003, K-2 200 m: 2003, 2005; K-4 200 m: 2001, 2002, 2003) and 7 bronzes (K-4 200 m: 2005, K-4 500 m: 2001, 2002, 2003, 2009, K-1 200 m: 2015, 2019).

References

External links

1982 births
Living people
Spanish female canoeists
Olympic canoeists of Spain
Olympic medalists in canoeing
Olympic silver medalists for Spain
Canoeists at the 2000 Summer Olympics
Canoeists at the 2004 Summer Olympics
Canoeists at the 2008 Summer Olympics
Canoeists at the 2012 Summer Olympics
Canoeists at the 2016 Summer Olympics
Canoeists at the 2020 Summer Olympics
Medalists at the 2020 Summer Olympics
ICF Canoe Sprint World Championships medalists in kayak
People from Cangas, Pontevedra
Sportspeople from the Province of Pontevedra
Mediterranean Games gold medalists for Spain
Mediterranean Games silver medalists for Spain
Mediterranean Games medalists in canoeing
Competitors at the 2005 Mediterranean Games
Competitors at the 2018 Mediterranean Games
Castelao Medal recipients